A congressional caucus is a group of members of the United States Congress that meets to pursue common legislative objectives. Formally, caucuses are formed as Congressional Member Organizations (CMOs) through the United States House of Representatives and governed under the rules of that chamber. Caucuses are informal in the Senate, and unlike their House counterparts, Senate groups receive neither official recognition nor funding from the chamber. In addition to the term caucus, they are sometimes called coalitions, study groups, task forces, or working groups. Caucuses typically have bipartisan membership and have co-chairs from each party. Chairs are listed below the name of each caucus.

This is a list of congressional CMOs of the United States Congress, as listed by the House Administration Committee as of December 1, 2022 This article also contains a list of sponsoring Members for Congressional Staff Organizations (CSOs) as of December 1, 2022.

Congressional Member Organizations (CMOs)

0–9 
5G Caucus
Debbie Dingell (D), Bill Johnson (R), Annie Kuster (D), Tim Walberg (R)

A 
Access to Legal Aid Caucus
Brian Fitzpatrick (R), Mary Gay Scanlon (D)
Addiction, Treatment and Recovery Caucus
Dave Joyce (R), David McKinley (R), Tim Ryan (D), Paul Tonko (D)
Advanced Nuclear Caucus
Chuck Fleischmann (R), Bill Foster (D)
Afghanistan Caucus
Sheila Jackson Lee (D), Joe Wilson (R)
Afterschool Caucus
David Cicilline (D), Vacant (R)
Agritourism Caucus
David Rouzer (R), Jennifer Wexton (D)
Ahmadiyya Muslim Caucus
Michael McCaul (R), Vacant (D)
Airborne Intelligence, Surveillance and Reconnaissance (ISR) Caucus
Don Bacon (R), John Garamendi (D)
Air Force Caucus
Kathy Castor (D), John Garamendi (D), Adam Kinzinger (R), Mike Turner (R)
Albanian Issues Caucus
Robert Aderholt (R), Jim Himes (D), Lisa McClain (R), Ritchie Torres (D)
Algae Caucus
Andy Biggs (R), Derek Kilmer (D), Darin LaHood (R), Scott Peters (D)
ALS Caucus
Ken Calvert (R), Jason Crow (D), Brian Fitzpatrick (R), Terri Sewell (D)
Aluminum Caucus
Larry Bucshon (R), Matt Cartwright (D), Bill Johnson (R), Haley Stevens (D)
America 250 Caucus
Robert Aderholt (R), Dwight Evans (D), Bonnie Watson Coleman (D)
Americans Abroad Congressional Caucus
Carolyn Maloney (D), Maria Salazar (R), Dina Titus (D)
America's Languages Caucus
David Price (D), Vacant (R)
Animal Protection Caucus
Earl Blumenauer (D), Vern Buchanan (R)
Appalachian National Scenic Trail Caucus
Don Beyer (D), Tim Burchett (R)
Apprenticeship Caucus
Suzanne Bonamici (D), Brett Guthrie (R)
Arctic Working Group Caucus
Rick Larsen (D), Vacant (R)
Argentina Caucus
Jeff Duncan (R), Jim Himes (D)
Army Caucus
John Carter (R), Dutch Ruppersberger (D)
Arthritis Caucus
Debbie Dingell (D), David McKinley (R)
Association of Southeast Asian Nations (ASEAN) Caucus
Joaquín Castro (D), Ann Wagner (R)
Asian Pacific American Caucus
Judy Chu (D)
Autism Caucus
Mike Doyle (D), Chris Smith (R)
Auto Caucus
Marcy Kaptur (D), Mike Kelly (R)
Auto Care Caucus
Brendan Boyle (D), Brian Fitzpatrick (R)
Automotive Performance and Motorsports Caucus
Sanford Bishop (D), Bill Posey (R)
Azerbaijan Caucus
Robert Aderholt (R), Steve Cohen (D), Henry Cuellar (D), Vacant (R)

B 
Baltic Caucus
Don Bacon (R), Rubén Gallego (D)
Bangladesh Caucus
Gerry Connolly (D), Dwight Evans (D), Ro Khanna (D), Joe Wilson (R), Vacant (R)
Baseball Caucus
Mike Doyle (D), Roger Williams (R)
Beef Caucus
Henry Cuellar (D), Vacant (R)
Biofuels Caucus
Cindy Axne (D), Angie Craig (D), Rodney Davis (R), Dusty Johnson (R), Mark Pocan (D), Adrian Smith (R)
Biomedical Research Caucus
Steve Cohen (D), John Curtis (R), Jackie Speier (D), Vacant (R)
Bipartisan Border Security Technology Caucus
Tony Gonzales (R), Vincente Gonzalez (D), Chuck Fleischmann (R), Tim Ryan (D)

Bipartisan Disabilities Caucus
Jim Langevin (D), Vacant (R)
Bipartisan Ethylene Oxide Task Force
Jody Hice (R), Brad Schneider (D)
Bipartisan Space and Aeronautics Caucus
Charlie Crist (D), Randy Weber (R)
Bipartisan Task Force for Combating Anti-Semitism
Ted Deutch (D), Brian Fitzpatrick (R), Kay Granger (R), Ted Lieu (D), Grace Meng (D), Chris Smith (R), Marc Veasey (D), Randy Weber (R)
Bipartisan Working Group to End Domestic Violence
Debbie Dingell (D), Young Kim (R), Debbie Lesko (R), Gwen Moore (D)
Black Girls and Women Caucus
Yvette Clarke (D), Robin Kelly (D), Bonnie Watson Coleman (D)
Black-Jewish Relations
Brenda Lawrence (D), Debbie Wasserman Schultz (D), Lee Zeldin (R)
Black Maternal Health Caucus
Alma Adams (D), Lauren Underwood (D)
Black Men and Boys Member Caucus
Danny Davis (D), Eleanor Holmes Norton (D)
Blockchain Caucus
Tom Emmer (R), Bill Foster (D), David Schweikert (R), Darren Soto (D)
Blood Cancer Caucus
Gus Bilirakis (R), Doris Matsui (D)
Blue Dog Coalition
Lou Correa (D), Stephanie Murphy (D), Tom O'Halleran (D)

 Border Security Caucus
Brian Babin (R), Andy Biggs (R)

Bosnia Caucus
Eddie Bernice Johnson (D), Chris Smith (R)
Bourbon Caucus
Andy Barr (R), John Yarmuth (D)
Brain Injury Task Force
Bill Pascrell (D), Don Bacon (R)
Brazil Caucus
Darin LaHood (R), Stephanie Murphy (D)
Broadcasters Caucus
Brendan Boyle (D), Tom Emmer (R)
Bureau of Prisons Reform Caucus
Fred Keller (R)
Burn Pits Caucus
Raul Ruiz (D), Brad Wenstrup (R)
Bus Caucus
Darin LaHood (R), Rick Larsen (D)

C 
California Aerospace Caucus
Ted Lieu (D), Ken Calvert (R)
California Coastal Caucus
Julia Brownley (D), Ted Lieu (D)
Cambodia Caucus
Alan Lowenthal (D), Vacant (R)
Campus Free Speech Caucus
Kat Cammack (R), Jim Jordan (R)
Cancer Caucus
Brian Fitzpatrick (R), Brian Higgins (D), Derek Kilmer (D)
Candy Caucus
Ann Kuster (D), Vacant (R)
Cannabis Caucus
Earl Blumenauer (D), David Joyce (R), Barbara Lee (D), Vacant (R)
Caribbean Caucus
Yvette Clarke (D), Stacey Plaskett (D), Maxine Waters (D)
Caucus on Armenian Issues
Gus Bilirakis (R), Frank Pallone (D)
Celiac Disease Caucus
Betty McCollum (DFL)
Central America Caucus
Norma Torres (D), Ann Wagner (R)
Chemistry Caucus
John Moolenaar (R), Cheri Bustos (D)
Chicken Caucus
Steve Womack (R), Jim Costa (D)
Childhood Cancer Caucus
Mike McCaul (R), Jackie Speier (D), G. K. Butterfield (D), Mike Kelly (R)
Coal Caucus
David McKinley (R)
Coastal Communities Caucus
Frank Pallone (D), Lois Frankel (D), Charlie Crist (D), Tom Rice (R)
College Football Caucus
Roger Williams (R)
Collegiate Sports Caucus
Steve Cohen (D)
Colombia Caucus
Mario Díaz-Balart (R), Albio Sires (D)
Colorectal Cancer Caucus
Rodney Davis (R), Donald Payne Jr. (D)
Commission on the Social Status of Black Men and Boys Caucus
Lucy McBath (D), Frederica Wilson (D)
Community Health Centers Caucus
Danny Davis (D), Kay Granger (R), Elise Stefanik (R)
Congenital Heart Caucus
Gus Bilirakis (R), Adam Schiff (D)
Congressional Abraham Accords Caucus
Cathy McMorris Rodgers (R), Brad Schneider (D), David Trone (D), Ann Wagner (R)
Congressional Advanced Air Mobility Caucus
Jay Obernolte (R), Jimmy Panetta (D)
Congressional Assyrian Caucus
Josh Harder (D)
Congressional Autonomous Vehicle Caucus
Debbie Dingell (D), Bob Latta (R)
Congressional Black Caucus (CBC)
Steven Horsford (D)
Congressional Cancer Survivors Caucus
Mark DeSaulnier (D), Buddy Carter (R)
Congressional Caucus for the Advancement of Torah Values
Don Bacon (R), Henry Cuellar (D)
Congressional Caucus on Black Innovation
Stacey Plaskett (D), Ritchie Torres (D)
Congressional Caucus on Certified Public Accountants (CPAs) and Accountants
Brad Sherman (D), Victoria Spartz (R)
Congressional Caucus on Qatari-American Strategic Relationships
Don Bacon (R), Andre Carson (D), Darrell Issa (R), Carolyn Maloney (D), Joe Wilson (R)
Congressional Caucus on Quantum
Ro Khanna (D), Nancy Mace (R)
Congressional Caucus on the Deadliest Cancers
Anna Eshoo (D), Fred Upton (R)
Congressional Caucus on Youth Sports
Kelly Armstrong (R), Rodney Davis (R), Ron Kind (D), Marc Veasey (D)
Congressional Caucus to Protect Kids
Debbie Lesko (R)
Congressional Cement Caucus
Jay Obernolte (R), Susan Wild (D)
Congressional Cigar Caucus
Tom Emmer (R), Dan Meuser (R)
Congressional Coalition on Adoption
Robert Aderholt (R), Adam Smith (D)
Congressional Conservative Opportunity Society Caucus
Ralph Norman (R)
Congressional Election Integrity Caucus
Mike Garcia (R), Claudia Tenney (R)
Congressional Electrification Caucus
Kathy Castor (D), Paul Tonko (D)
Congressional Emergency Medical Services (EMS) Caucus
Debbie Dingell (D), Richard Hudson (R)
Congressional Endometriosis Caucus
Jenniffer González Colón (R), Nikema Williams (D)
Congressional Energy Savings Performance Caucus
John Moolenaar (R)
Congressional Energy Storage Caucus
Mark Takano (D), John Curtis (R)
Congressional European Union (EU) Caucus
Joe Wilson (R), Brendan Boyle (D)
Congressional Expand Social Security Caucus
John Larson (D), Debbie Dingell (D), Terri Sewell (D), Raúl Grijalva (D), Conor Lamb (D),
Congressional Explosive Ordnance Disposal (EOD) Caucus
Rick Crawford (R), Brian Mast (R), Jimmy Panetta (D), Vacancy (D)
Congressional Fertilizer Caucus
Dan Newhouse (R), Frank Lucas (R), Jim Costa (D), Angie Craig (D)
Congressional First-Generation Student Caucus
Brendan Boyle (D)
Congressional Freedom of the Press Caucus
Adam Schiff (D), Vacancy (R)
Congressional Golf Caucus
Nancy Mace (R)
Congressional Horse Caucus
Andy Barr (R), Paul Tonko (D)
Congressional Hydrogen and Fuel Cell Caucus
Mike Doyle (D), Brian Fitzpatrick (R), John Larson (D)
Congressional International Financial Institutions (IFI) Education Caucus
Dean Phillips (D), John Rutherford (R)
Congressional IT Modernization Caucus 
Gerry Connolly (D), Darrell Issa (R)
Congressional Liberty Caucus
Warren Davidson (R)
Congressional Maker Caucus
Tim Ryan (D), Mark Takano (D)
Congressional Mayor's Caucus
Emanuel Cleaver (D), Beth Van Duyne (R)
Congressional Military Transition Assistance Pathway (MTAP) Caucus
Jack Bergman (R), Scott Peters (D)
Congressional Military Veterans Caucus
Mike Thompson (D), Gus Bilirakis (R), Chrissy Houlahan (D)
Congressional Modeling and Simulation Caucus
Bobby Scott (D), Stephanie Murphy (D), Jack Bergman (R), John Rutherford (R)
Congressional Nuclear Energy Caucus
Paul Gosar (R), Vacant (D)
Congressional Optics and Photonics Caucus 
Brian Mast (R), Joseph Morelle (D)
Congressional Ports Opportunity, Renewal, Trade and Security (PORTS) Caucus
Alan Lowenthal (D), Randy Weber (R)
Congressional Postal Caucus
Virginia Foxx (R), Carolyn Maloney (D)
Congressional Pre-K and Child Care Caucus
Joaquin Castro (D), Katherine Clark (D), Tom Cole (R), Rodney Davis (R)
Congressional Range and Testing Center Caucus
Scott DesJarlais (R), Julia Brownley (D)
Congressional Research and Development (R&D) Caucus
Bill Foster (D), Jim Baird (R)
Congressional Pet Caucus
Angie Craig (D), Dusty Johnson (R)
Congressional Potato Caucus
Russ Fulcher (R), Mike Simpson (R)
Congressional School Choice Caucus
John Moolenaar (R)
Congressional Science, Technology, Engineering, Arts and Math (STEAM) Caucus
Suzanne Bonamici (D), Elise Stefanik (R)
Congressional Steel Caucus
Mike Bost (R), Rick Crawford (R), Conor Lamb (D), Frank Mrvan (D)
Congressional Supply Chain Caucus
Colin Allred (D), Angie Craig (D), Rodney Davis (R), David Rouzer (R)
Congressional Trauma Informed Care Caucus
Danny Davis (D), Mark DeSaulnier (D), Mike Gallagher (R), Bryan Steil (R)
Congressional Voting Rights Caucus
Marc Veasey (D), Bobby Scott (D), Terri Sewell (D), Nikema Williams (D)
Congressional White Oak Caucus
Andy Barr (R), Ami Bera (D), Steve Cohen (D), Scott DesJarlais (R)
Congressional World Bank Caucus
Brendan Boyle (D), Brian Fitzpatrick (R)
Congressional Uyghur Caucus 
Chris Smith (R), Thomas Suozzi (D)
Construction Procurement Caucus 
Scott Peters (D), Pete Stauber (R)
Cooperative Business Caucus
Jim Baird (R), Mark Pocan (D)
Copper Caucus
Brian Higgins (D), Bob Latta (R)
Coronavirus Task Force
Brian Fitzpatrick (R), Sheila Jackson Lee (D)
Counter-Kleptocracy Caucus
John Curtis (R), Brian Fitzpatrick (R), Bill Keating (D), Tom Malinowski (D)
COVID-19 Global Vaccination Caucus
Jake Auchincloss (D), Pramila Jayapal (D), Raja Krishnamoorthi (D), Tom Malinowski (D), Mark Pocan (D)
Crime Survivors and Justice Caucus
Jim Costa (D), Veronica Escobar (D), Debbie Lesko (R)
Critical Materials Caucus
Guy Reschenthaler (R), Eric Swalwell (D)
Crohns and Colitis Caucus 
Carolyn Maloney (D), John Rutherford (R)
CTE Caucus
Jim Langevin (D), Glenn Thompson (R)
Cut Flower Caucus 
Jaime Herrera Beutler (R), Salud Carbajal (D), Dan Newhouse (R), Jimmy Panetta (D), Chellie Pingree (D), Vacant (R)
Czech Caucus
Lloyd Doggett (D), Vacant (R)

D 
Dairy Caucus
Joe Courtney (D), Suzan DelBene (D) (R), Mike Simpson (R), David Valadao (R), Peter Welch (D)
Deaf Caucus
Mark Takano (D), John Rutherford (R)
Defense Spending Reduction Caucus
Barbara Lee (D), Mark Pocan (D)
Defense Workforce, Innovation, and Industry Caucus
Troy Balderson (R), Jason Crow (D)
Delaware River Watershed
Vacant (D), Brian Fitzpatrick (R)
Democratic Women's Caucus
Lois Frankel (D), Brenda Lawrence (D), Jackie Speier (D)
Diabetes Caucus
Vacant (R), Diana DeGette (D)
Digital Trade Caucus
Darin LaHood (R), Suzan DelBene (D)
Directed Energy Caucus
Jim Langevin (D), Doug Lamborn (R)
Direct Selling Caucus
Richard Hudson (R), Marc Veasey (D)
Dominican Caucus
Adriano Espaillat (D)
Dutch Caucus 
Bill Huizenga (R), Derek Kilmer (D)
Dyslexia Caucus
Julia Brownley (D), Bruce Westerman (R)

E 
E-Commerce Caucus
Brett Guthrie (R), Pete Aguilar (D)
Education Opportunity and Innovation Caucus
John Moolenaar (R)
Egypt Human Rights Caucus 
Don Beyer (D), Tom Malinowski (D)
Electromagnetic Pulse Caucus
Doug Lamborn (R), Yvette Clarke (D)
Electromagnetic Warfare Working Group
Don Bacon (R), Jim Langevin (D), Rick Larsen (D), Austin Scott (R)
Emerging Technology Caucus
Paul Gosar (R)
End the Youth Vaping Epidemic Caucus
Raja Krishnamoorthi (D), Chris Stewart (R)
Energy Export Caucus
Jodey Arrington (R), Henry Cuellar (D), Luis Correa (D), Carol Miller (R)
Energy Savings Performance Caucus
Adam Kinzinger (R), Richard Hudson (R), Peter Welch (D)
Entrepreneurship Caucus
Bill Foster (D), French Hill (R), Stephanie Murphy (D), David Schweikert (R), Marc Veasey (D)
Estuary Caucus
Bill Posey (R), Rick Larsen (D), Brian Mast (R), Suzanne Bonamici (D)
Everglades Caucus
Mario Díaz-Balart (R), Debbie Wasserman Schultz (D)

F 
Farmer Cooperative Caucus
Jim Costa (D), Sam Graves (R)
FFA Caucus
Tracey Mann (R), Jimmy Panetta (D)
Flat Tax Caucus
Michael Burgess (R)
Florida Ports Caucus
Frederica Wilson (D), Bill Posey (R)
Food Allergy Caucus 
Doris Matsui (D), Van Taylor (R)
Food Recovery Caucus
Dan Newhouse (R), Chellie Pingree (D)
For Country Caucus
Jared Golden (D), Van Taylor (R)
Former Local Officials Caucus
Gerry Connolly (D), Kay Granger (R), David Joyce (R), Greg Stanton (D)
Foster Youth Caucus
Don Bacon (R), Karen Bass (D), Brenda Lawrence (D), Jim Langevin (D), Markwayne Mullin (R)
Fourth Amendment Caucus
Zoe Lofgren (D), Thomas Massie (R)
Fragile X Caucus
Joe Courtney (D), Chris Smith (R)
Fragrance Caucus
Barry Loudermilk (R), Bonnie Watson Coleman (D)
Franchise Caucus
Rodney Davis (R), Josh Gottheimer (D)
Freedom from Big Tech Caucus
Ken Buck (R), Josh Gottheimer (D)
French-American Caucus
Bill Keating (D), Bob Latta (R), Adam Schiff (D), Joe Wilson (R)
Friends of Belarus Caucus
Marcy Kaptur (D), Bill Keating (D), Chris Smith (R), Joe Wilson (R)
Friends of Belgium Caucus
Lizzie Fletcher (D), Mike Turner (R)
Friends of Denmark Caucus
Steny Hoyer (D), Fred Upton (R)
Friends of Egypt Caucus
Mario Diaz-Balart (R)
Friends of Finland Caucus
Vern Buchanan (R), Debbie Dingell (D), Ann McLane Kuster (D), Vacant (R)
Friends of Liechtenstein Caucus
Don Beyer (D), Larry Bucshon (R), Dan Kildee (D), Randy Weber
Friends of New Zealand Caucus
Rick Larsen (D), Kevin Brady (R)
Friends of Norway Caucus
Rick Larsen (D), Betty McCollum (D), Kelly Armstrong (R), Vacant (R)
Friends of Scotland Caucus
Robert Aderholt (R), Steve Cohen (D)
Friends of Spain Caucus
Jenniffer González (R), Henry Cuellar (D)
Friends of Sweden Caucus
Jack Bergman (R), Don Beyer (D)
Friends of Uruguay Caucus
Brian Fitzpatrick (R), Albio Sires (D)
Friends of Wales Caucus
Morgan Griffith (R)
Future Forum Caucus
Darren Soto (R)
Future of Transportation Caucus
 (D), Jesus "Chuy" Garcia (D), Mark Takano (D)

G 
Gaming Caucus
Dina Titus (D), Guy Reschenthaler (R)
Garifuna Caucus
Ritchie Torres (D)
General Aviation Caucus
Sam Graves (R), Marc Veasey (D)
Georgia Caucus
Adam Kinzinger (R), Gerry Connolly (D)
German American Caucus
Glenn Thompson (R), Bill Keating (D)
Get Out the Lead Caucus
Lisa Blunt Rochester (D), Debbie Dingell (D), Peter Meijer (R), Rashida Tlaib (D)
Global Health Caucus
Betty McCollum (D), Vacant (R)
Global Investment in American Jobs Caucus
Andy Barr (R), French Hill (R), Kathleen Rice (D), Marilyn Strickland (D)
Global Road Safety Caucus
Steve Cohen (D), Richard Hudson (R)
GOP Doctors Caucus
Andy Harris (R), Michael Burgess, Brad Wenstrup (R)

H 
Haiti Caucus
Yvette Clarke (D), Val Demings (D), Andy Levin (D), Ayanna Pressley (D)
Hazards Caucus
Suzan DelBene (D), Vacant (R)
HBCU Caucus
Alma Adams (D), French Hill (R)
Hearing Health Caucus
David McKinley (R), Mike Thompson (D)
Heart and Stroke Caucus
Chris Smith (R), Joyce Beatty (D)
Hellenic Issues Caucus
Gus Bilirakis (R), Carolyn Maloney (D)
Hepatitis Caucus
Grace Meng (D), Hank Johnson (D)
High Performance Building Caucus
David McKinley (R), Peter Welch (D)
High Tech Caucus
Doris Matsui (D), Michael McCaul (R)
Hispanic Caucus
Nanette Barragán (D)
Hispanic Conference
Mario Díaz-Balart (R), Tony Gonzales (R)
Hispanic-Serving Institutions Caucus
Joaquin Castro (D), Mario Diaz-Balart (R), Raúl Grijalva (D), Jenniffer González (R)
Historic Preservation Caucus
Mike Turner (R), Earl Blumenauer (D)
HIV/AIDS Caucus
Barbara Lee (D), Jenniffer González (R)
Hockey Caucus
Mike Quigley (D), Brian Higgins (R), Tom Emmer (R), John Katko (R)
Homelessness Caucus
Vacant (D), Eddie Bernice Johnson (D)
Hostage Task Force
Ted Deutch (D), French Hill (R)
House Agriculture Research Caucus
Rodney Davis (R), Jimmy Panetta (D)
House Defense Communities Caucus
Henry Cuellar (D), Doug Lamborn (R)
House Diplomacy Caucus
Ami Bera (D), David Cicilline (D), Brian Fitzpatrick (R), Peter Meijer (R), Dean Phillips (D), Ann Wagner (R)
House Live Event Caucus
Tony Cárdenas (D), Brett Guthrie (R), Nancy Mace (R), Kathleen Rice (D)
House Republican Israel Caucus
Doug Lamborn (R), Lee Zeldin (R), David Kustoff (R), Joe Wilson (R)
Hunger Caucus
James McGovern (D), Vacant
Hydrocephalus Caucus
Lloyd Doggett (D), Chris Smith (R)
Hypersonic Caucus
Jim Banks (R), Mo Brooks (R)

I 
Independent Colleges Caucus
David Joyce (R), Derek Kilmer (D)
India Caucus
Ro Khanna (D), Brad Sherman (D), Michael Waltz (R), Vacant (R)
Infection Prevention Control in Long Term Care Caucus
Gus Bilirakis (R), Jan Schakowsky (D)
Innovation and Entrepreneurship Caucus
Joe Neguse (D), Van Taylor (R)
Innovation Caucus
Ami Bera (D), Suzan DelBene (D), Mike Kelly (R), Markwayne Mullin (R)
Integrative Health and Wellness Caucus
Judy Chu (D), Vacant (R)
Intellectual Property Promotion and Privacy Prevention Caucus
Ben Cline (R), Joe Neguse (D), Adam Smith (D), Vacancy (R)
International Basic Education Caucus
Brian Fitzpatrick (R), Mike Quigley (D)
International Conservation Caucus
David Joyce (R), Vacant (R), Henry Cuellar (D), Betty McCollum (D)
International Religious Freedom Caucus
Gus Bilirakis (R), Henry Cuellar (D)
International Workers' Rights Caucus
Jan Schakowsky (D)
Invasive Species Caucus
Mike Thompson (D), Elise Stefanik (R)
Investing in Innovation Caucus
Bryan Steil (R)
Iraq Caucus
Adam Kinzinger (R), Seth Moulton (D)

J 

 Job Corps Caucus
Brett Guthrie (R), Sanford Bishop (D)
 Joint Strike Fighter Caucus
John Larson (D), Chris Stewart (R), Mike Turner (R), Marc Veasey (D)
 Justice for Warriors Caucus
 Louie Gohmert (R)

K 
Kidney Caucus
Larry Bucson (R), Suzan DelBene (D)
Korea Caucus
Gerry Connolly (D), Mike Kelly (R), Ami Bera (D), Joe Wilson (R)

L 
Labor Caucus
Debbie Dingell (D), Steven Horsford (D), Donald Norcross (D), Mark Pocan (D), Linda Sánchez (D),  Thomas Suozzi (D)
Latino-Jewish Caucus
Mario Diaz-Balart (R), Adriano Espaillat (D), Jaime Herrera Beutler (R), Debbie Wasserman Schultz (D)
Law Enforcement Caucus
John Rutherford (R), Bill Pascrell (D)
LGBT+ Equality Caucus
David Cicilline (D)
Library of Congress Caucus
Bob Aderholt (R), Earl Blumenauer (D)
Long-Range Strike Caucus
Vicky Hartzler (R), Emanuel Cleaver (D)
Lupus Caucus
Eddie Bernice Johnson (D), Bill Keating (D), Andrew Garbarino (R)
Lyme Disease Caucus
Chris Smith (R), Henry Cuellar (D)

M 
Macedonian Caucus
Brendan Boyle (D), Claudia Tenney (R)
MACH 1 Caucus
Jake Ellzey (R), Scott Franklin (R), Mike Garcia (R), August Pfluger (R)
Main Street Caucus
Don Bacon (R), Mike Bost (R), Pete Stauber (R)
Manufacturing Caucus
Vacant (R), Tim Ryan (D)
Maple Caucus 
Chris Jacobs (R), Chris Pappas (D), Peter Welch (D)
Maternity Caucus
Jaime Herrera Beutler (R), Lucille Roybal-Allard (D)
Media Diversity Brain Trust
Val Demings (D)
Media Fairness Caucus
Alex Mooney (R)
Mental Health Caucus
Grace Napolitano (D), John Katko (R)
Military Sexual Assault and Prevention Caucus
Mike Turner (R), Elaine Luria (D)
Minor League Baseball Caucus
Roger Williams (R)
Missile Defense Caucus
Doug Lamborn (R), Donald Norcross (D)
Mitochondrial Disease Caucus 
Brian Fitzpatrick (R), James McGovern (D)
Moldova Caucus
August Pfluger (R), David Price (D)
Mongolia Caucus
Dina Titus (D), Vacant (R)
Montenegro Caucus
Doug Lamborn (R), Chellie Pingree (D)
Motorcycle Caucus
Michael Burgess (R), Tim Walberg (R)
Motorsports Caucus
Bill Posey (R), Mike Thompson (D)
Multicultural Media Caucus
Yvette Clarke (D), Tony Cardenas (D), Judy Chu (D)
Multiple Sclerosis Caucus
David Price (D), Vacant (R)
Municipal Finance Caucus
Dutch Ruppersberger (D), Vacant (R)

N 
National Guard Caucus
Steven Palazzo (R), Tim Ryan (D)
National Heritage Area Caucus
Paul Tonko (D), David McKinley (R)
National Marine Sanctuary Caucus
Garret Graves (R), Jared Huffman (D)
National Service Caucus
Doris Matsui (D), David Price (D)
Native American Caucus
Sharice Davids (D), Tom Cole (R)
Naval Education Caucus
James Langevin (D), Jimmy Panetta (D)
Navy and Marine Corps Caucus
Rob Wittman (R), Seth Moulton (D)
Neuroscience Caucus
Earl Blumenauer (D), Cathy McMorris Rodgers (R)
New Americans Caucus
Adriano Espaillat (D), Norma Torres (D)
New Democrat Coalition
Suzan DelBene (D)
NextGen 9-1-1 Caucus
Richard Hudson (R), Anna Eshoo (D)
Nigerian Caucus
Sheila Jackson Lee (D), Vacant (R)
Nuclear Cleanup Caucus
Susie Lee (D), Chuck Fleischmann (R)
Nuclear Weapons and Arms Control Working Group
Donald Beyer (D), John Garamendi (D)
Nursing Caucus
David Joyce (R), Rodney Davis (R), Suzanne Bonamici (D), Lucille Roybal-Allard (D)

O 
Oceans Caucus
Suzanne Bonamici (D), Vacant (R)
Offshore Wind Caucus
Elaine Luria (D)
Ohio River Basin Caucus
John Yarmuth (D), Bill Johnson (R)
Olympic and Paralympic Caucus
Jim Langevin (D), Dave Reichert (R), Ed Perlmutter (D), Tom Rooney (R)
One World Caucus
Brian Fitzpatrick (R), Dean Phillips (D)

P 
Pacific Island Caucus
Ed Case (D), Vacant (R)
Pakistan Caucus
Jim Banks (R), Sheila Jackson Lee (D), Thomas Suozzi (D)
Paper and Packaging Caucus
Tom Rice (R), Kurt Schrader (D)
Parkinson's Disease Caucus
Carolyn Maloney (D), Hank Johnson (D), Gus Bilirakis (R)
Payer State Caucus
Bill Foster (D), Van Taylor (R)
PCOS Caucus
Brian Fitzpatrick (R), David Scott (D), Debbie Wasserman Schultz (D), Jenniffer Gonzáles (R)
Peace Corps Caucus
John Garamendi (D), Garret Graves (R)
Peripheral Artery Disease Caucus 
Gus Bilirakis (R), Donald Payne Jr. (D)
Personalized Medicine Caucus 
Tom Emmer (R), Eric Swalwell (D)
Philanthropy Caucus
Danny Davis (D), Vacant (R)
Pilots Caucus
Sam Graves (R), Vacant (D)
Poland Caucus
Chris Smith (R), Marcy Kaptur (D), William Keating (D), Vacant (R)
Pollinator Protection Caucus
Vacant (D), Rodney Davis (R)
Portuguese Caucus
David Valadao (R), Jim Costa (D), Lee Zeldin (R), David Cicilline (D)
Prayer Caucus
Rick Allen (R)
Prescription Drug Abuse Caucus
Hal Rogers (R), Stephen Lynch (D)
Primary Care Caucus
Joe Courtney (D), David Rouzer (R)
Problem Solvers Caucus
Brian Fitzpatrick (R), Josh Gottheimer (D)
Pro-Choice Caucus
Diana DeGette (D), Barbara Lee (D)
Progressive Caucus 
Pramila Jayapal (D)
Pro-Life Caucus
Andy Harris (R), Chris Smith (R)
Propane Caucus
Bob Latta (R), Kurt Schrader (D)
PSLF Caucus
Brendan Boyle (D), David Joyce (R)
Public Schools Caucus
Mariannette Miller-Meeks (R), Ritchie Torres (D)
Public Works and Infrastructure Caucus
Brian Fitzpatrick (R), Dina Titus (D)

Q 

 Quiet Skies Caucus
 Stephen Lynch (D), Eleanor Holmes Norton (D)

R 
Rare Disease Caucus
Leonard Lance (R), G. K. Butterfield (D)
Reality Caucus
Yvette Clarke (D), Suzan DelBene (D), Ted Lieu (D)
Recycling Caucus
Frank Pallone (D), Rodney Davis (R), David Joyce (R), Haley Stevens (D)
Republican Governance Group
John Katko (R)
Republican Study Committee
Jim Banks (R)
Rice Caucus
Rick Crawford (R), Bennie Thompson (D)
Romania Caucus
Mike Turner (R)
Rugby Caucus
Alex Mooney (R), Eleanor Holmes Norton (D)
Rum Caucus
Jenniffer González (R), Stacey Plaskett (D)
Rural Broadband Caucus
Adam Kinzinger (D), Bob Latta (R), Tom O'Halleran (D), Mark Pocan (D), Robert Wittman (R), Peter Welch (D)
Rural Caucus
Adrian Smith (R), Terri Sewell (D)

S 
SALT Caucus
Andrew Garbarino (R), Josh Gottheimer (D), Young Kim (R), Thomas Suozzi (D)
SEC Caucus
Kat Cammack (R), Diana Harshbarger (R)
Second Amendment Caucus
Lauren Boebert (R), Tom Massie (R)
Serbian Caucus
Emanuel Cleaver (D), Vacant (R)
Service Organization Caucus
Jimmy Panetta (D), Glenn Thompson (R)
Service Women and Women Veterans Caucus
Chrissy Houlahan (D), Elaine Luria (D), Mikie Sherrill (D)
Shellfish Caucus
Mike Thompson (D), John Larson (D), Rob Wittman (R)
Shipbuilders Caucus
Rob Wittman (R), Joe Courtney (D)
Sickle Cell Caucus
Danny Davis (D), G.K. Butterfield (D), Barbara Lee (D), Burgess Owens (R)
Sikh Caucus
John Garamendi (D), David Valadao (R)
Singapore Caucus
Rick Larsen (D), David Schweikert (R)
Single Parents Caucus
Nancy Mace (R)
Skilled American Workforce Caucus
Brenda Lawrence (D), French Hill (R)
Skin Cancer Caucus
Jim Cooper (D), David Joyce (R), Carolyn Maloney (D), John Joyce (R)
Sleep Health Caucus
Zoe Lofgren (D), Rodney Davis (R)
Slovak Caucus
Jim Banks (R), Frank Mrvan (D)
Small Brewers Caucus
Mike Kelly (R), Patrick McHenry (R), Marilyn Strickland (D), Nikema Williams (D)
Small Business Caucus
Kevin Horn (R), Chris Pappas (D)
Smart Cities Caucus
Yvette Clarke (D), Darrell Issa (R)
Soccer Caucus
Don Bacon (R), Kathy Castor (D), Darin LaHood (R), Rick Larsen (D)
Solar Caucus
Raja Krishnamoorthi (D), Ralph Norman (R)
Sound Money Caucus
Andy Barr (R), Warren Davidson (R)
Space Force Caucus
Brian Babin (R), Salud Carbajal (D), Charlie Crist (D), Jason Crow (D), Doug Lamborn (R), Michael Waltz (R)
Special Operations Forces Caucus
Scott Peters (D), Kathy Castor (D), Richard Hudson (R)
Spectrum Caucus
Brett Guthrie (R), Doris Matsui (D)
Spina Bifida Caucus
Chris Smith (R), Henry Cuellar (D)
Sportsmen's Caucus
Debbie Dingell (D), Richard Hudson (R)
Sri Lanka Caucus
Bob Aderholt (R), Hank Johnson (D)
Stakeholder Capitalism Caucus
Chrissy Houlahan (D), Dean Phillips (D)
Submarine Caucus
Joe Courtney (D), Jim Langevin (D), Rob Wittman (R), Vacant (R)
Suburban Caucus
Ann Wagner (R)
Sugar Caucus
Mike Simpson (R), Vacant (D)
Sustainable Energy and Environment Coalition (SEEC)
Gerry Connolly (D), Doris Matsui (D), Paul Tonko (D)
Syria Caucus
Brendan Boyle (D), Adam Kinzinger (R)

T 
Taiwan Caucus
Mario Díaz-Balart (R), Gerry Connolly (D), Albio Sires (D), Vacant (R)
Telehealth Caucus
Mike Thompson (D), Peter Welch (D), Bill Johnson (R), Davis Schweikert (R)
Tennessee Valley Corridor Caucus
Chuck Fleischmann (R), Mike Rogers (R)
Term Limits Caucus
Jodey Arrington (R), Ro Khanna (D)
Tire Caucus
Jim Cooper (D), Richard Hudson (R)
Tourette Syndrome Caucus
Steve Cohen (D), Lee Zeldin (R)
Trademark Caucus
Ted Deutch (D), Michael McCaul (R)
Trails Caucus
Vacant (R), Earl Blumenauer (D)
Transparency Caucus
Mike Quigley (D), Tim Walberg (R)
Travel and Tourism Caucus
Gus Bilirakis (R), Dina Titus (D)
Tuberculosis (TB) Elimination Caucus
Ami Bera (D), Vacant (R)
Tunisia Caucus
Vacant (D), Dave Schweikert (R)

U 
Ukraine Caucus
Brian Fitzpatrick (R), Andy Harris (R), Marcy Kaptur (D), Mike Quigley (D)
Unexploded Ordnance Caucus
Jackie Speier (D), Bill Johnson (R)
United States Coast Guard Caucus
Salud Carbajal (D), Joe Courtney (D), Rick Larsen (D), John Garamendi (D), Bob Gibbs (R), Sean Patrick Maloney (D), Brian Mast (R), Vacancy (R)
U.S.-Bermuda Friendship Caucus
G.K. Butterfield (D)
U.S.-China Working Group
Darin LaHood (R), Rick Larsen (D)
U.S.-Japan Caucus
Adrian Smith (R), Joaquin Castro (D)
U.S.-Lebanon Friendship Caucus
Charlie Crist (D), Debbie Dingell (D), Darrell Issa (R), Darin LaHood (R)
USO Caucus
Mike Rogers (R), Adam Smith (D)
Uzbekistan Caucus
Trent Kelly (R), Vicente González (D)

V 
Valley Fever Task Force Caucus
Kevin McCarthy (R), Dave Schweikert (R)
Values Action Team
Vicky Hartzler (R)
Venezuela Democracy Caucus
Debbie Wasserman Schultz (D), Mario Díaz-Balart (R)
Veterinary Medicine Caucus
Kurt Schrader (D), Dusty Johnson (R)
Video Game and Esports Caucus
James McGovern (D), Cathy McMorris Rodgers (R), Stephanie Murphy (D), Van Taylor (R)
Vietnam Caucus
Zoe Lofgren (D), Chris Smith (R), Alan Lowenthal (D)
Vision Caucus
David Price (D), Gus Bilirakis (R), Vacant (R)
Volleyball Caucus
Kaiali'i Kahele (D), Lori Trahan (D)

W 
Water and Sanitation Caucus
Earl Blumenauer (D), Darin LaHood (R), Grace Meng (D), Vacant (R)
Western Caucus
Dan Newhouse (R)
Wildfire Caucus
John Curtis (R), Joe Neguse (D)
Wild Salmon Caucus
Jared Huffman (D), Vacant (R)
Wine Caucus
Mike Thompson (D), Dan Newhouse (R)
Women in STEM Caucus
Chrissy Houlahan (D), Debbie Lesko (R), Haley Stevens (D), Vacant (R) 
Women, Peace, and Security Caucus
Lois Frankel (D), Michael Waltz (R)
Women's Caucus
Madeleine Dean (D), Jenniffer Gonzalez (R)
Working Forest Caucus
Bruce Westerman (R), Sanford Bishop (D), Jaime Herrera Beutler (R), Derek Kilmer (D)
World Wildlife, Oceanic, Environmental, and Biodiversity Caucus
Brian Fitzpatrick (R), Dean Phillips (D)

Y 

 Youth Challenge Caucus
Salud Carbajal (D), David McKinley (R), Grace Napolitano (D)
 Youth Mentoring Caucus
 Mary Gay Scanlon (D)

Z 

 Zoo Caucus
Vacant (R), Mike Quigley (D)

Congressional Staff Organizations (CSOs)
Capitol Hill Intern Association
Sponsors: Adriano Espaillat (D), Jennifer Wexton (D)
Clean Energy and Technology Staff Association
Sponsor: Joaquín Castro (D)
Congressional Armenian Staff Association
Sponsors: Gus Bilirakis (R), Frank Pallone (D), Jackie Speier (D), David Valadao (R)
Congressional Asian Pacific American Staff Association (CAPASA)
Sponsors: Judy Chu (D), Grace Meng (D)
Congressional Black Association
Sponsor: Yvette Clarke (D)
Congressional Entertainment Staff Association
Sponsor: Yvette Clarke (D)
Congressional Jewish Staff Association 
Sponsor: Jamie Raskin (D)
Congressional South Asian-American Staff Association
Sponsors: Ami Bera (D), Ro Khanna (D), Raja Krishnamoorthi (D)
Congressional Space Advocates
Sponsor: Bill Posey (R)
Congressional Staff Association on Foster Youth
Sponsor: Karen Bass (D)
Congressional Tech Staff Association
Sponsor: Bonnie Watson Coleman (D)
Democratic Digital Communications Staff Association
Sponsor: Mark Takano (D)
Dreamers Congressional Staff Association
Sponsor: Pete Aguilar (D)
Hispanic Staff Association 
Sponsors: Veronica Escobar (D), Jenniffer González (R)
Italian American Staff Association 
Sponsors: Mark Amodei (R), Bill Pascrell (D)
Latter-Day Saint Staff Association
Sponsor: Blake Moore (R)
Lesbian, Gay, Bisexual and Transgender (LGBT) Congressional Staff Association
Sponsor: David Cicilline (D)
MENA Staff Association 
Sponsors: Stephanie Bice (R), Andy Levin (D), Rashida Tlaib (D), David Trone (D)
Modernization Staff Association
Sponsors: Bill Huizenga (R), Seth Moulton (D)
Plant-Based Congressional Staff Association 
Sponsor: Jamie Raskin (D)
Progressive Staff Association
Sponsor: Mark Pocan (D)
Republican Communications Association (RCA)
Sponsor: Ann Wagner (R)
Women's Congressional Staff Association
Sponsors: Lois Frankel (D), Kat Cammack (R)

See also
Congressional Research Service
Committee on House Administration

References

External links
Congressional Member And Staff Organizations – Committee on House Administration

 
Lists related to the United States Congress